Pays de la Loire is one of the 18 regions of France, in the west of the mainland. It was created in the 1950s to serve as a zone of influence for its capital, Nantes, one of a handful of "balancing metropolises".

Geography 

Pays de la Loire is in western France, bordered by Brittany on the northwest, Normandy on the north, Centre-Val de Loire on the east, Nouvelle-Aquitaine on the south, and the Bay of Biscay of the North Atlantic Ocean on the southwest.

Departments and former province 

Pays de la Loire comprises five departments: Loire-Atlantique, Maine-et-Loire, Mayenne, Sarthe, Vendée.

Pays de la Loire is made up of the following historical provinces:

 Part of Brittany, with its old capital Nantes contained within the Loire-Atlantique department. This is up to 20% of historical Brittany. The other 80% makes up the currently neighbouring region of Brittany
 Anjou: is largely absorbed into the Maine-et-Loire department; the rest in the immediately adjoining departments (the whole of the historical province Anjou is contained inside Pays de la Loire).
 Maine: is now divided between the Mayenne and Sarthe departments; the whole of the former province of Maine is contained inside Pays de la Loire.
 Part of Poitou: is contained within the Vendée department; most of the old province of Poitou is inside the Nouvelle-Aquitaine region to the south.
 Part of Perche: is within the northeast of Sarthe department; the rest of Perche is inside the Normandy and Centre-Val de Loire regions.
 Small part of Touraine: southeast of Maine-et-Loire department; the rest, most of the former province of Touraine is inside the Centre region.

Thus the name of the region, chosen by the French central government, was not based on history, but a postwar creation of purely geographical reference:  ("lands")  ("of the Loire").

The Loire Valley, which is a UNESCO listed World Heritage Site since 2000, is located both in the administrative regions of Pays de la Loire and Centre-Val de Loire. The majority of the châteaux of the Loire Valley such as Montsoreau, Angers, Saumur or Brézé in Pays de la Loire are located in the Maine-et-Loire department, Pays de la Loire has numerous prominent monuments, such as the castles of Laval, and the Nantes Château des Ducs de Bretagne, the Royal Fontevraud Abbey (the widest monastic ensemble in Europe), and the old city of Le Mans. It also has many natural parks such as the Brière and the Marsh of Poitou.

Demography 

Evolution of the population listed by departments:

A steep increase in the population was seen particularly as people migrated from all over France to the Loire region due to the rise of Nantes to prominence.

Economy 

The gross domestic product (GDP) of the region was €119.1 billion in 2018, accounting for 5.1% of French economic output. GDP per capita adjusted for purchasing power was €28,200 or 94% of the EU27 average in the same year. The GDP per employee was 102% of the EU average.

Major communities 

The biggest city in Pays de la Loire is Nantes, which is the sixth most populated city in France with over 319,000 people (city proper) and a metropolitan population of almost 1,000,000.

Angers is another metropolis of the region. It has a metropolitan population of about 400,000 and is the third biggest job provider in north-western France, just behind Nantes and Rennes. Saint-Nazaire is a major harbour town downstream from Nantes on the mouth of the Loire river.

Le Mans is another city in Pays de la Loire. Situated in north-east Pays de la Loire, Le Mans area is home to over 300,000 (metropolitan population).

 Nantes
 Angers
 Le Mans
 La Roche-sur-Yon
 Cholet
 Saint-Nazaire
 Laval

See also 

 Saint-Paulin cheese, another Trappist cheese from France
 Château de Montsoreau-Museum of Contemporary Art, featuring the Philippe Méaille Collection, the largest radical conceptual art collection of the Art & Language movement.
 Montsoreau Flea Market, the largest flea market in the Loire Valley, every second Sunday of the month.
 Regional Council of Pays de la Loire, deliberative assembly of the region
 Jublains archeological site

Notes

References

External links 

 Official Pays de la Loire Website
 Pays de la Loire Tourism Website
 Regional prefecture
 National Institute of Statistics and Economic Studies of France

 
NUTS 2 statistical regions of the European Union
Regions of France